The Chief of the General Staff, India was a senior military commander in the British Indian Army from 1906 to 1947, and in the independent Indian Army from 1947 until 1965.

History
During British rule, the Chief of the General Staff, India assisted the Commander-in-Chief, India in commanding the British Indian Army. The post was largely honorary as all power resided in the hands of Commander-in-Chief, India. After Indian independence in 1947, the CGS remained a senior staff appointment. In January 1959, the appointment of Deputy Chief of the Army Staff (DCOAS) was established as the deputy commander of the Indian Army until it was superseded by the new post of Vice Chief of the Army Staff (VCOAS) In January 1965. Subsequently, the post of VCOAS replaced the CGS.

Chiefs of the General Staff
Holders of the post have been:

British Indian Army (1906–1947)

Indian Army (1947–1965)

See also
 Commander-in-Chief of India
 Deputy Chief of the Army Staff

Notes

References

Military history of British India
British military appointments
Indian military appointments